The 1996–97 Greek Football Cup was the 55th edition of the Greek Football Cup.

Tournament details

Totally 72 teams participated, 18 from Alpha Ethniki, 18 from Beta, and 36 from Gamma. It was held in 7 rounds, included final. After 8 years the phase of groups was suppressed, while the teams of Alpha Ethniki would enter in the competition in the Round of 32.

The Round of 16 was very interesting. Olympiacos eliminated PAOK and Panathinaikos eliminated Iraklis. Also, Ionikos tipped OFI with 7 goals. For third time in the 4 last years AEK Athens and Panathinaikos were pondered over in the Final, held in Karaiskakis Stadium. AEK Athens won on the penalty shootout.

The loss of Cup for Panathinaikos, in combination with their mediocre course in the championship, meant the unique time at the last 25 years that the club did not participate in any European competition.

Calendar

Knockout phase
Each tie in the knockout phase, apart from the final, was played over two legs, with each team playing one leg at home. The team that scored more goals on aggregate over the two legs advanced to the next round. If the aggregate score was level, the away goals rule was applied, i.e. the team that scored more goals away from home over the two legs advanced. If away goals were also equal, then extra time was played. The away goals rule was again applied after extra time, i.e. if there were goals scored during extra time and the aggregate score was still level, the visiting team advanced by virtue of more away goals scored. If no goals were scored during extra time, the winners were decided by a penalty shoot-out. In the final, which were played as a single match, if the score was level at the end of normal time, extra time was played, followed by a penalty shoot-out if the score was still level.The mechanism of the draws for each round is as follows:
There are no seedings, and teams from the same group can be drawn against each other.

First round

|}

Second round

|}

Bracket

Round of 32

|}

Round of 16

|}

Quarter-finals

|}

Semi-finals

Summary

|}

Matches

AEK Athens won 3–1 on aggregate.

Panathinaikos won 7–0 on aggregate.

Final

The 53rd Greek Cup Final was played at the Karaiskakis Stadium.

References

External links
Greek Cup 1996-97 at RSSSF

Greek Football Cup seasons
Greek Cup
Cup